Umut Dilan Bozok (born 19 September 1996) is a professional footballer who plays as a striker for Süper Lig club Trabzonspor. Born in France, he plays for the Turkey national team.

Club career
Bozok began playing football with his local club l'Etoile Naborienne Saint-Avold at the age of 6. He began as a defender because of his strong physique. He then moved to the youth academy of FC Metz in 2011. After spending three years in Metz's second team, Bozok moved to GS Consolat in Marseille for first-team football. After a successful season with GS Consolat, becoming the top scorer in the Championnat National with 18 goals in 31 matches, Bozok transferred to Ligue 2 side Nîmes on 9 June 2017 for €150,000.

Bozok made his professional debut for Nîmes in a 1–0 Ligue 2 loss to Reims on 28 July 2017. He scored his first professional hattrick in a 4–0 Ligue 2 win over Brest on 20 October 2017. Bozok finished the top scorer of the 2017–18 Ligue 2 with 24 goals in 36 games, and helped promote Nîmes to the Ligue 1 for the 2018–19 season.

On 18 June 2019, Bozok signed with French club Lorient, for three years and one optional. The transfer fee was reported as 1.5 million euros. On 1 February 2021, Bozok moved to Ligue 2 club Troyes on a loan deal until the end of the season. On 22 July 2021, he was loaned to Kasımpaşa in the Turkish Süper Lig for the 2021–22 season. With 20 goals in 38 games, Bozok was named "Gol Kralı" (top scorer) of the Süper Lig that season.

International career
Bozok represents Turkey at an international level. In his debut for the Turkey U21 national team, he scored a brace in a 4–0 win over Azerbaijan U21 on 28 March 2017. Bozok made his debut for the Turkey national football team on 25 September 2022 in a Nations League game against the Faroe Islands.

Personal life
Bozok was born in France, and is of Turkish descent. Outside of football, he is a pianist and a black-belt in karate.

Career statistics

Honours
Lorient
Ligue 2: 2019–20

Individual
 Championnat National Top goalscorer: 2016–17 (18 goals)
 Ligue 2 Top goalscorer: 2017–18 (24 goals)
 Süper Lig Top goalscorer: 2021–22 (20 goals)
Süper Lig Striker of the Year: 2021–22

References

External links
 
 

1996 births
Living people
People from Saint-Avold
French people of Turkish descent
Citizens of Turkey through descent
Sportspeople from Moselle (department)
Turkish footballers
French footballers
Footballers from Grand Est
Association football forwards
Turkey international footballers
Turkey youth international footballers
Turkey under-21 international footballers
Ligue 1 players
Ligue 2 players
Championnat National players
Championnat National 2 players
Championnat National 3 players
Süper Lig players
FC Metz players
Nîmes Olympique players
FC Lorient players
ES Troyes AC players
Kasımpaşa S.K. footballers
Trabzonspor footballers